Schlegel's francolin (Campocolinus schlegelii) is a species of bird in the family Phasianidae. It is found in Cameroon, the Central African Republic, Chad, and South Sudan. According to the IUCN Red List, in which the species is rated as "least concern", the global population is unknown, but there have been no fluctuations in population.

Formerly classified in the genus Peliperdix, a 2020 study found it, the white-throated francolin (C. albogularis), and the coqui francolin (C. coqui) to together comprise a new genus Campocolinus. The International Ornithological Congress has accepted these findings.

References

Campocolinus
Birds of Central Africa
Birds described in 1863
Taxa named by Theodor von Heuglin
Taxonomy articles created by Polbot
Taxobox binomials not recognized by IUCN